Eric-Julien Rakotondrabe (born December 1, 1980) is a Malagasy footballer currently plays for Fanilo Japan Actuels.

Honours

Club

Stade Olympique de l'Emyrne	
THB Champions League (1) : Champion : 2001

Fanilo Japan Actuels	
THB Champions League (1) : Champion : 2011

National team
Football at the Indian Ocean Island Games silver medal:2007

References

External links
 

1980 births
Living people
Malagasy footballers
Madagascar international footballers
Association football midfielders
USCA Foot players
Japan Actuel's FC players
SO Emyrne players
FC BFV players